The 2020 Tuvalu A-Division was the 20th season of top flight association football in Tuvalu. The season started in March 14 and finish on May 23 of the 2020.

Participating Clubs

The 2020 edition of the A-Division was played between 8 teams:

Nauti FC A1 (Funafuti)
FC Tofaga (Vaitupu)
FC Niutao (Niutao)
Nauti FC A2 (Funafuti)
Tamanuku   (Nukufetau)
Lakena United  (Nanumea)
Vaoloa FC     (Nui)
Ha'apai United   (Nanumaga)

Matches

Round 1
Matches for round 1 were all held on March 14:

Nauti A1      11-1 Nauti FC A2
Lakena United 4-3 Ha'apai United
FC Niutao 3-2 Vaoloa    
FC Tofaga 5-1 Tamanuku

Round 2
Matches for round 1 were all held on April 18:

FC Tofaga 7-1 Ha'apai United
Nauti FC A1 4-2 Lakena United
FC Niutao 0-0 Nauti FC A2
Tamanuku 2-3 Vaoloa

Round 3
Matches for round 1 were all held on April 25.

Nauti FC A1 1-0 FC Niutao
Tamanuku 2-1 Nauti FC A2
FC Tofaga5-1 Lakena United
Ha'apai United 5-1 Vaoloa

Round 4
Matches for round 1 were all held on May 2:

Ha'apai United 1-3 Nauti FC A2
(Sepuli 71; Selilo 11, Teuati 12, Geoff 73)
Vaoloa 3-3 Lakena United
(Peego 8, Pasiale 11, 30; Tolua 10, 30, Vaieta 16)
Tamanuku 2-3 FC Niutao 
(Felo 73, 80; Alani 13, Tefau 16, 78)
Nauti FC A1       2-0 FC Tofaga
(Hosea 4, Steven 40)

Round 5
Matches for round 1 were all held on May 9:

Nauti FC A1       4-3 Tamanuku
(Kaitu 1, Hosea 8, 52, Nokisi 66; Felo 45,74, Ikapoti 80)

Vaoloa        0-24 FC Tofaga
(Alopoua 8, 49, 54, 57, Eric 12, 29, 44, Sueni 16, 39, 72, 80, Falefou 26, 38, James 33, 35, 40, 70, 74, Fata 41, 50, 71, Katepu 64, 65, 68)

Ha'apai United 1-3 FC Niutao 
(Fakavae 34' Tefau 18' Teni 42, Roger 65)

Nauti FC A2       4-2 Lakena United
(Puleia 25, 68, John 29og, Keni 64; Kaumoana 44, Kee 71)

Round 6
Matches for round 1 were all held on May 16:

Ha'apai United 2-6 Tamanuku
(Tafea 55, Sepuli 57; Felo 7, 23pen, 40, Liktuka 25, 43, Ka 73)

Nauti FC A1      10-0 Vaoloa
(Kaitu 23, Nathan 29, 63, 80, Hosea 35, 43, 65, 70, Nokisi 37, Henry 78)

Nauti FC A2       0-2 FC Tofaga
(James 1, 79)

Lakena United 0-1 FC Niutao 
(Tefau 22pen)

Round 7
Matches for round 1 were all held on May 23:

Lakena United awd Tamanuku
(awarded 0-3, Lakena forfeited)

FC Niutao 1-5 FC Tofaga
(Mataitela 1; Katepu 8pen, James 10, 15, Iasona 35, Fakavae 35)

Nauti FC A2       awd Vaoloa
(awarded 3-0, Vaoloa forfeited)

Nauti FC A1       3-0 Ha'apai United
(Ivan 5, Hosea 15, Telavi 49)

Final Classification

 1.Nauti A1            7   7  0  0  35- 6  21  Champions  Funafuti
 -------------------------------------------------------------------
 2.Tofaga              7   6  0  1  48- 6  18             Vaitupu
 3.Niutao              7   4  1  2  11-11  13             Niutao
 4.Nauti A2            7   3  1  3  12-18  10             Funafuti
 5.Tamanuku            7   3  0  4  19-18   9             Nukufetau
 6.Lakena United       7   1  1  5  12-23   4             Nanumea
 7.Vaoloa              7   1  1  5   9-50   4             Nui
 8.Ha'apai             7   1  0  6  13-27   3             Nanumaga

References

External links 
 tnfa.tv
 vriendenvantuvalu.nl 
 soccerway.com

Tuvalu A-Division seasons